Justin Edward Fairfax (born February 17, 1979) is an American lawyer and politician who served as the 41st lieutenant governor of Virginia from 2018 to 2022. A member of the Democratic Party, he is the second African-American elected statewide in Virginia, following Douglas Wilder. In 2019, he faced sexual assault allegations dating to 2000 and 2004, which he denied. In 2021, he was a Democratic candidate for Governor of Virginia. He finished fourth in the Democratic primary with 3.54% of the vote.

Early life and career
Fairfax's ancestors were enslaved to the Lords Fairfax of Cameron (for whom Fairfax County, Virginia is named). His ancestor, Simon Fairfax, was freed by Thomas Fairfax, 9th Lord Fairfax of Cameron, who manumitted his slaves as part of his Swedenborgian beliefs. Justin Fairfax was presented with a copy of the manumission document by his father on the day he was sworn in as Virginia's lieutenant governor in 2018. Fairfax's eldest brother, Roger Jr., is a legal scholar.

Fairfax moved with his family from Pittsburgh to Northeast Washington, D.C., when he was five years old. One of four children, Fairfax graduated from DeMatha Catholic High School in Hyattsville, Maryland, where he was senior class president. Fairfax then graduated from Duke University in 2000, with a degree in public policy. After serving on the staff of the Senate Judiciary Committee for two years, Fairfax earned a J.D. degree from Columbia Law School, where he was a member of the Columbia Law Review.

Career 

He was a briefing coordinator for Tipper Gore during the 2000 presidential campaign of Al Gore, in the campaign's Nashville, Tennessee office. Fairfax was also a staffer for Democratic Senator John Edwards of North Carolina, in his Washington office.

Over the summer of 2004, he joined the John Kerry presidential campaign, as a body man for Edwards, then the Vice Presidential candidate.

He then served as law clerk to Judge Gerald Bruce Lee of the U.S. District Court for the Eastern District of Virginia in 2005. He worked in the Washington office of the law firm WilmerHale before joining the U.S. Attorney's Office for the Eastern District of Virginia in 2010. Fairfax worked for two years as a federal prosecutor in Alexandria, Virginia. He served as deputy coordinator of the Northern Virginia Human Trafficking Task Force during this time.

Fairfax ran for public office for the first time in 2013, seeking the Democratic nomination for state attorney general. He lost to Mark Herring, but surprised party insiders with his strong performance in the primary. Herring defeated Fairfax by about 4,500 votes out of 141,600 cast in a closer-than-expected race. The Washington Post praised both candidates during the primary, but endorsed Fairfax, writing that he had displayed "an agile and impressive command of the issues with a prosecutor's passion for justice."

After the race, Fairfax co-chaired the 2014 reelection campaign of U.S. Senator Mark Warner from Virginia. The following year, he was recruited to work at the law firm of Venable LLP, in the firm's Tysons, Virginia office. Fairfax then worked for Morrison & Foerster, a law firm where he made partner in September 2018. In July 2019, following sexual assault allegations against him, Fairfax announced that he was resigning from Morrison & Foerster, which had accepted his resignation.

Fairfax was a visitor at the Sanford School of Public Policy from 2008 to 2014 and again in 2015. On February 8, 2019, the school's dean, Judith Kelley, asked Fairfax to step down while pending the resolution of the allegations.

Lieutenant Governor of Virginia

Campaign

In 2017, Fairfax ran for Lieutenant Governor of Virginia. In the Democratic primaries, he faced Gene Rossi, a federal prosecutor, who had trained Fairfax when they worked together in Alexandria's Eastern District federal court, and Susan Platt, a political lobbyist and consultant, who had served as chief of staff to Joe Biden in the 1990s (Platt had also run Virginia Senator Chuck Robb's 1994 re-election campaign and Don Beyer's unsuccessful 1997 gubernatorial campaign). Citing their unease with Dominion Energy's planned construction of the Atlantic Coast Pipeline, all three candidates in the Democratic primary pledged to refuse campaign contributions from Dominion Energy, despite the company being the largest contributor to Virginia political campaigns for both Republicans and Democrats. Although early polling showed Platt in the lead, Fairfax significantly outraised both of his opponents and proved victorious in the primary election, carrying about 49% of the vote.

Fairfax then faced Republican nominee Jill Vogel, a state senator from Fauquier County, in the general election. Fairfax and Vogel raised comparable amounts of money for their campaigns—$3.9 million and $3.7 million, respectively. A forum between Fairfax and Vogel was held at Piedmont Community College on August 9, 2017 and a debate between the two candidates was held at the University of Richmond on October 5.

Noting that Fairfax had been largely unknown when he ran for Attorney General four years earlier, The Washington Post wrote that Fairfax had transitioned from "party crasher" to "party insider" in the time since, having "methodically done the work necessary to raise his profile and pay dues." The Washington Post went onto endorse Fairfax in the race, calling him "bright, competent, well-versed" and "the much better choice".

Fairfax's opposition to the Atlantic Coast and Mountain Valley pipelines led to him being omitted from a small number of campaign flyers that were distributed by the campaign for Democratic gubernatorial nominee Ralph Northam. These flyers were released at the request of Laborers' International Union of North America (LIUNA), which supports the pipeline - LIUNA had endorsed Northam (and Northam's running mate for Attorney General, Mark Herring, who was included on the flyer), but not Fairfax. As Fairfax is black, while Northam and Herring are both white, some activists criticized the Northam campaign's decision to accommodate LIUNA's request. Fairfax responded to the controversy by saying, "This should not have happened, and it should not happen again, and there needs to be robust investment in making sure that we are communicating with African American voters and we are engaging our base." The Fairfax campaign later remarked that the Democratic ticket was "working well together", adding "One piece of literature does not change that." All houses that received the LIUNA flyers also received standard campaign flyers including Fairfax.

In the final days of the campaign, former Virginia governor Douglas Wilder weighed in on the flyer controversy, saying that Fairfax had not "been dealt a good hand". Wilder endorsed Fairfax, but never endorsed Northam. As the election drew to a close, Fairfax and Vogel aired attack ads against each other.

Fairfax won the election by 5.5%. He became only the second African-American in Virginia history to be elected to statewide office (the first being Douglas Wilder, who served as governor, as well as lieutenant governor).

Tenure
During his time in office, Fairfax's role as the lieutenant governor of Virginia was part-time. Fairfax announced in December 2017 that he was leaving his law firm, Venable. His law partner at Venable, Larry Roberts, served as his campaign chairman during the election and is currently serving as his chief of staff. In September 2018, Fairfax joined the law firm of Morrison & Foerster, continuing the historic practice of Virginia lieutenant governors maintaining employment while in office. Fairfax became the first head of the Democratic Lieutenant Governors Association (DLGA), which was launched in August 2018.

On January 19, 2019, Fairfax protested a tribute in the state Senate honoring Confederate General Robert E. Lee's birthday. "History repeats itself," Fairfax tweeted. "I will be stepping off the dais today in protest of the Virginia Senate honoring Robert E. Lee...I'll be thinking of this June 5, 1798, manumission document that freed my great-great-great grandfather Simon Fairfax from slavery in Virginia. #WeRiseTogether."

Sexual assault allegations

In early February 2019, Big League Politics reported that Fairfax had been accused by Vanessa C. Tyson, an associate professor at Scripps College and fellow at Stanford University, of sexual assault at a hotel at the 2004 Democratic National Convention in Boston. Tyson said she had suppressed memories of the event but began telling close friends about it when she saw pictures of Fairfax running for lieutenant governor in 2017. Tyson had first approached The Washington Post with her allegation after Fairfax won election in November 2017, but the Post said that it decided not to run the story because it could not corroborate the story or find similar incidents in Fairfax's past. Tyson also approached a friend, Virginia Congressman Bobby Scott, with the allegation around the same time, but Scott declined to act on it. According to The New York Times, at least six friends of Tyson reported that she told them about the alleged assault between 2017 and 2018 but she had no real time corroboration from 2004.

Fairfax denied the accusation, saying his encounter with Tyson was consensual and the timing of the reports was intended to smear him; beginning February 1, after the discovery of a racist photo on Ralph Northam's medical school yearbook, there had been widespread calls for Northam to resign and let Fairfax become Governor of Virginia. Fairfax also insinuated that supporters of Northam, or someone connected with Richmond mayor Levar Stoney, a potential political rival since both were speculated as possible Democratic candidates for governor in 2021, may have been behind the allegation going public.

Tyson released a statement detailing her allegations, saying the encounter started as consensual kissing but ended with Fairfax forcing her to perform oral sex on him. Tyson said she is a Democrat with no political agenda and felt compelled to release the statement because Fairfax "has tried to brand me as a liar to a national audience, in service to his political ambitions, and has threatened litigation." In response, Fairfax issued a statement saying, "I wish her no harm or humiliation, nor do I seek to denigrate her or diminish her voice. But I cannot agree with a description of events that I know is not true." NBC News reported that Fairfax used a misogynistic profanity to describe Tyson in a private staff meeting after the allegation came out, according to two sources in the meeting. Fairfax's chief of staff and policy director conceded that he did use profanity but denied it was towards his accuser and Fairfax demanded NBC and its reporters retract their reporting. After the story broke, Fairfax hired the same legal team that represented Brett Kavanaugh during his confirmation process, while Tyson hired the same legal team that represented Kavanaugh's accuser Christine Blasey Ford. Virginia Congresswoman Jennifer Wexton tweeted her support for Tyson.

On February 8, 2019, a second woman, Meredith Watson, came forward with sexual assault allegations against Fairfax, alleging that he raped her in a "premeditated and aggressive" attack in 2000 when both were undergraduate students at Duke University. A college friend of Watson stated she remembered Watson telling her about the assault the day after it happened. Watson said she had been previously raped by a Duke basketball player, later identified as Corey Maggette, and brought the matter to the dean but was discouraged from pursuing the matter. Watson's attorney said that Watson had one interaction with Fairfax after the alleged assault outside a campus party, during which Watson said "Why did you do it?" and reported Fairfax replied, "I knew that because of what happened to you last year, you'd be too afraid to say anything." Watson's attorney said this showed Fairfax "used the prior rape of his 'friend' against her when he chose to rape her in a premeditated way." Fairfax denied the second accusation, issuing a statement saying,

The second allegation caused a wave of calls for Fairfax to resign from politicians including many Democrats in the General Assembly; most of Virginia's Democratic members of Congress, including Tim Kaine; former Governor Terry McAuliffe; and multiple nationally prominent Democrats, including several running for president in 2020. Delegate Patrick Hope, also a Democrat, announced that he would introduce articles of impeachment against Fairfax within three days if Fairfax had not resigned. The Virginia legislature's Black Caucus asked Fairfax to resign. Hope backed off his plan to introduce articles of impeachment after fellow House Democrats said they were not prepared for the process, saying "additional conversations" were needed. Tyson's lawyer has reached out to the Suffolk County, Massachusetts district attorney to schedule a meeting to detail her allegations, while a spokesman for Fairfax said he would be willing to cooperate with any probe and to "explore all options with regard to filing his own criminal complaint in response to the filing of a false criminal complaint against him."

After the allegations became public, Fairfax was placed on leave from his law firm, asked to step down from the board of visitors at Duke University's Sanford School of Public Policy, and left his post as chairman of the Democratic Lieutenant Governors Association. Four of his staffers (two from his state office and two from his political action committee) quit in the wake of the allegations.

Policy positions

On economic issues, Fairfax supports policies such as a $15 minimum wage, action on student loan debt, and more job training and apprenticeships for skilled trades such as electrician, welder, and machine operator. Fairfax supports investment in transportation and infrastructure, and implementation of Governor Terry McAuliffe's Virginia Clean Power Plan to reduce greenhouse gas emissions in order to combat climate change. Fairfax favors promotion of renewable energy such as wind and solar.

Fairfax supports the Affordable Care Act and an expansion of Medicaid to low-income Virginians. He supports caps on campaign contributions. Fairfax has expressed support for single-payer healthcare.

On social issues, Fairfax supports abortion rights and same-sex marriage. He is supportive of gun control measures such as universal background checks, a ban on high-capacity magazines, and an assault weapons ban. He supports criminal justice reform, and supports former Governor McAuliffe's restoration of voting rights to felons who have completed probation and parole terms. Fairfax favors additional action to combat the opioid crisis, and supports the decriminalization of the possession of limited amounts of marijuana for personal use.

Personal life
Fairfax lives in Annandale, Virginia, with his wife, Cerina and two children. He is Catholic.

Electoral history

See also 
 List of minority governors and lieutenant governors in the United States

References

External links

 Government website
 Official campaign website
 Official biography from Venable LLP
 

1979 births
20th-century African-American people
21st-century African-American politicians
21st-century American politicians
African-American people in Virginia politics
Candidates in the 2021 United States elections
Columbia Law School alumni
DeMatha Catholic High School alumni
Lieutenant Governors of Virginia
Living people
People from Annandale, Virginia
Sanford School of Public Policy alumni
Virginia Democrats
Virginia lawyers
Wilmer Cutler Pickering Hale and Dorr people
African-American Catholics
People associated with Morrison & Foerster